, also known as Beyond the Heavens, is a Japanese manga series by Hagin Yi and King Gonta. It started in Kodansha's seinen manga magazine Weekly Morning in 1994. Following Hagin Yi's death in 1998, King Gonta continued the manga alone, until its conclusion in 2005. Its chapters were collected in thirty-six tankōbon volumes.

A twenty-six episode anime television series adaptation by Madhouse was broadcast on Nippon TV from April to September 2009.

As of February 2017, the manga had over 18 million copies in circulation. In 1998, Sōten Kōro won the 22nd Kodansha Manga Award in the general category.

Story
Sōten Kōros story is based loosely on the events taking place in Three Kingdoms period of China during the life of the last Chancellor of the Eastern Han Dynasty, Cao Cao (155 – March 15, 220), who also serves as the main character.

The Three Kingdoms period has been a popular theme in Japanese manga for decades, but Sōten Kōro differs greatly from most of the others on several points. One significant difference is its highly positive portrayal of its main character, Cao Cao, who is traditionally the antagonist in not only Japanese manga, but also most novel versions of the Three Kingdoms period, including the original 14th-century version, Romance of the Three Kingdoms by Luo Guanzhong. Another significant difference from others is that the storyline primarily uses the original historical account of the era, Records of Three Kingdoms by Chen Shou, as a reference rather than the aforementioned Romance of the Three Kingdoms novel. By this, the traditional hero of Romance of the Three Kingdoms, Liu Bei, takes on relatively less importance within the story and is portrayed in a less positive light. Yet, several aspects of the story are in fact based on the novel version, including the employment of its original characters such as Diao Chan, as well as anachronistic weapons such as Guan Yu’s Green Dragon Crescent Blade and Zhang Fei’s Viper Spear.

A consistent theme throughout the story is Cao Cao's perpetual desire to break China and its people away from its old systems and ways of thinking and initiate a focus on pragmatism over empty ideals. This often puts him at odds with the prevalent customs and notions of Confucianism and those that support them.

Characters

Media

Manga

After Hagin Yi died of live cancer in 1998, King Gonta continued the story. The series finished in 2005. Kodansha collected its chapters in thirty-six tankōbon volumes, released from October 23, 1995, to January 23, 2006. An eighteen-volume bunkoban edition was published from December 12, 2000, to December 12, 2006. A three-in-one volume edition, consisting of twelve volumes, was published from May 5 to October 23, 2009.

Anime
An anime television series, animated by Madhouse, was announced in February 2009. The series was broadcast on Nippon TV from April 8 to September 30, 2009.

Reception
In 1998, along with Gambling Apocalypse: Kaiji, Sōten Kōro won the 22nd Kodansha Manga Award in the general category. As of February 2009, the manga had over 10 million copies in circulation. As of February 2017, the manga had over 18 million copies in circulation.

Notes

References

External links
  
  
 

Epic anime and manga
Historical anime and manga
Kodansha manga
Madhouse (company)
Seinen manga
Works based on Romance of the Three Kingdoms
Winner of Kodansha Manga Award (General)